These are the results of the 2022 Asian Wrestling Championships which took place between 19 and 24 April 2022 in Ulaanbaatar, Mongolia.

Men's freestyle

57 kg
23 April

61 kg
24 April

65 kg
23 April

70 kg
23 April

74 kg
24 April

79 kg
23 April

86 kg
24 April

92 kg
24 April

97 kg
23 April

125 kg
24 April

Men's Greco-Roman

55 kg
19 April

60 kg
20 April

63 kg
19 April

67 kg
20 April

72 kg
20 April

77 kg
19 April

82 kg
20 April

87 kg
19 April

97 kg
20 April

130 kg
19 April

Women's freestyle

50 kg
21 April

53 kg
22 April

55 kg
21 April

57 kg
22 April

59 kg
21 April

62 kg
22 April

65 kg
22 April

68 kg
21 April

72 kg
22 April

76 kg
21 April

References

External links
Official website

2022 Results